Information Systems is a peer-reviewed scientific journal covering data-intensive technologies underlying database systems, business processes, social media, and data science. It is published 8 times a year by Elsevier. The editors-in-chief are Dennis Shasha (New York University), Gottfried Vossen (University of Münster), and Matthias Weidlich (Humboldt University of Berlin).

Abstracting and indexing 
The journal is abstracted and indexed in:

According to the Journal Citation Reports, the journal has a 2016 impact factor of 2.777.

References

External links 
 

Publications established in 1975
Elsevier academic journals
English-language journals
Computer science journals